Holy Names High School is a private Catholic girls college preparatory high school located in the Oakland Hills in Oakland, California. It is located in the Roman Catholic Diocese of Oakland. The campus is also home to Aurora Elementary School and the former home to the convent for the Sisters of the Holy Names of Jesus and Mary. Holy Names High School is sponsored by the Sisters of the Holy Names of Jesus and Mary.

History
When established on the shore of Lake Merritt in 1868, Holy Names was the first high school built in Oakland. The school moved to its present  campus on Harbord Drive in upper Rockridge in 1931. The school attendance for the first year at its new location, 1931–1932, was 302.

Academics

Holy Names prides itself for its rigorous academic program that reaches the standards required for college and university admission and entrance. Teachers often help students refine their academic talents and identify areas that they can strengthen and improve. Students engage in small group and class discussions, actively participating in their own learning. In addition, they can take advantage of highly competitive honors and advanced placement courses as well as the tutorial services offered through a math lab and mentor program. Students are actively encouraged to help each other in their journey of learning and self-realization.

Students are required to take seven classes each year, with classes ranging from such subjects including Vocal Ensemble to Earth Science. Each is recommended to go beyond the minimum required classes needed to graduate in order to pursue the subjects they love. All students are required to take Introduction to Engineering Design (IED), a Project Lead The Way course, their freshman year.

Accreditation and accolades
In 1933, Holy Names High School was included on the list of accredited schools by the California Department of Education. Since then its accreditation has been consistently renewed. The school currently is accredited for the maximum term by the Western Association of Schools and Colleges (WASC). Holy Names has twice been recognized as an exemplary Blue Ribbon School by the Department of Education.

Notable alumnae
Ileana Matzorkis, Radio Host 98.5 KFOX 
Karrin Allyson, four time Grammy-nominated jazz vocalist and pianist
Caitlin Flanagan, noted writer and blogger

References

External links 

 Holy Names High School

Roman Catholic Diocese of Oakland
Girls' schools in California
Catholic secondary schools in California
High schools in Oakland, California
Educational institutions established in 1868
Bay Counties League
1868 establishments in California